Asphondylia lacinariae is a species of gall midges in the family Cecidomyiidae.

References

Further reading

 
 

Cecidomyiinae
Articles created by Qbugbot
Insects described in 1935

Diptera of North America
Taxa named by Ephraim Porter Felt
Gall-inducing insects